Le Vermont is a commune in the Vosges department of the Grand Est region of northeastern France.

See also
Communes of the Vosges department

References

Communes of Vosges (department)
Salm-Salm